Cambyses II was the second King of Kings of the Achaemenid Empire from 530 to 522 BC. He was the son and successor of Cyrus the Great and his mother was Cassandane.

Before his accession, Cambyses had briefly served as the governor of northern Babylonia under his father from April to December 538 BC. Afterwards, he resided in the Babylonian cities of Babylon and Sippar, before being appointed by his father as co-ruler in 530 BC.  His father then set off on an expedition against the Massagetae of Central Asia, where he met his end. Cambyses thus became the sole ruler of the vast Achaemenid Empire, facing no reported  opposition.

His relatively brief reign was marked by his conquests in North Africa, notably Egypt, which he conquered after his victory over the Egyptian pharaoh Psamtik III at the battle of Pelusium in 525 BC. After having established himself in Egypt, he expanded the empire's holdings in Africa, including the conquest of Cyrenaica. In the spring of 522 BC, Cambyses hurriedly left Egypt to deal with a rebellion in Persia. 

While en route in Syria (Eber-Nari), he received a wound to the thigh, which was soon affected by gangrene. Cambyses died three weeks later at a location called Agbatana, which is most likely the modern city of Hama. He died childless, and was thus succeeded by his younger brother Bardiya, who ruled for a short period before being overthrown by Darius the Great, who went on to increase the power of the Achaemenids even further.

Etymology 
The origins of the name of "Cambyses" is disputed in scholarship; according to some scholars, the name is of Elamite origin, whilst others associate it with Kambojas, an Iranian people who inhabited northwestern India. The name of Cambyses is known in other languages as: Elamite Kanbuziya; Akkadian Kambuziya; Aramaic Kanbūzī.

Background 
Cambyses was the eldest son of Cyrus the Great and Cassandane. Cambyses had a younger brother named Bardiya, and three sisters named Artystone, Atossa and Roxanne. Cambyses' paternal grandfather was his namesake Cambyses I, the king of Persis from 600 to 559 BC. The family was descended from a line of rulers of Persian tribes, who starting with Cyrus, expanded their reach over Persis, subjugating the Median Empire, the Neo-Babylonian Empire, Lydia and Central Asia, thus establishing the Achaemenid Empire.

Early life 

In April 538 BC, Cambyses was appointed by his father as the governor of the northern part of Babylonia, including its city Babylon, whilst the central and southern part continued to be directly supervised by Cyrus and his bureaucrats. Before his appointment, Cambyses had taken part in a ritual at the regular New Year festival on 27 March 538 BC, where he received the royal sceptre in Esagila, a temple dedicated to the god Marduk. His governorship, however, lasted only nine months;  Cyrus dismissed him from the post in December 538 BC for unknown reasons. After his dismissal, Cambyses continued to mostly reside in the Babylonian cities of Babylon and Sippar. 

According to Babylonian records, both Cambyses and Cyrus carried the title of "King of Babylon, King of the Lands" in 538/7 BC, which indicates that Cyrus had appointed him as co-ruler some years before his campaign against the Massagetae. Cyrus' younger son, Bardiya, was given his own realm in Central Asia, which was exempted from paying tribute. Cambyses reportedly took part in the expedition against the Massagetae, but, due to his being the heir to the throne, he was sent back to Persia, before Cyrus fell to the Massagetae. Cambyses had his father's body carried to Pasargadae in Persis, where he was buried in a tomb that had been prepared for him earlier.

Military campaigns

Preparations against Egypt and the conquest of Cyprus

Cambyses' accession to the Achaemenid throne was relatively smooth. Ruling over a vast but young empire, Cambyses preserved his authority over the subjugated lands, but also expanded his dominion over Egypt, the last prominent power in the Near East. According to the French Iranologist Pierre Briant, "this must not be seen as a more or less irrational and uncontrollable desire to take over the entire inhabited world". On the contrary, Cambyses' action had already been planned by his father, who wanted to unify Babylonia with the lands of the Trans-Euphrates (an area that stretched from Posideium to Egypt). This would eventually require conquering the lands situated between the Euphrates and Nile rivers, and therefore necessitated conflict with Egypt, which had previously and more recently shown interest in the area. 

The incumbent pharaoh of Egypt was Amasis II, who had been ruling since 570. His ally, Polycrates, a Greek ruler of Samos, posed a considerable threat to the Achaemenids, launching several raids that jeopardised Achaemenid authority. However, Polycrates eventually forsook his Egyptian allies, and reached out to Cambyses, whose plans he was well acquainted with. His sudden change of alliances was undoubtedly due to his uneasy position, with the Spartans raising a force against him, and the rising hostility of some of the Samian aristocrats, who preferred partnership with Egypt. Another former ally of Amasis II, the Carian military leader Phanes of Halicarnassus, had also joined Cambyses after escaping assassins sent by the pharaoh. Cambyses, before starting his expedition into Egypt, had seized Cyprus from Amasis II, which was reportedly a heavy blow to the latter.

Conquest of Egypt and its surroundings

By 526 BC, Amasis II had died, and his son Psamtik III had succeeded him, thus weakening Egypt's position. In the meantime, Cambyses had made substantial preparations for his army. He had essentially laid the foundations for the Persian navy, which was crucial to his ambitions to conquer Egypt. The navy was created using men and equipment from Phoenicia and  Asia Minor. During his march to Egypt, Cambyses made a treaty with the Arabs, who controlled the desert area between Gaza and the Egyptian frontier. This treaty granted Cambyses sufficient water for his forces to reach the Nile. This also paved the way for Cambyses to extend his authority over the unsubdued lands between Egypt and Persia, including Gaza, a prominent commercial region, which equalled that of Sardis in Lydia. The region served as the headquarters for the Persian expedition into Egypt. 

In 525 BC, Cambyses finally invaded Egypt. In the spring of that year, the Persian and Egyptian forces clashed at Pelusium, where the Persians emerged victorious. According to one author, Cambyses was able to defeat the Egyptians by putting cats, sheep, dogs and other animals that the Egyptians considered sacred in the front lines. This led the Egyptians to cease using their war engines for fear of killing an animal and angering the gods. The forces of Cambyses then laid siege to Memphis, where Psamtik III and his men had fortified themselves. Despite the considerable resistance by the pharaoh's forces, Cambyses captured Memphis and established a Persian-Egyptian garrison there. The length of the siege is not specified by the 5th-century BC Greek historian Herodotus. Regardless, by summer, all of Egypt was under Persian suzerainty. Cambyses now adopted the aspirations of the last pharaohs in seeking to control the neighbouring lands towards the west (Libya and Cyrenaica) and south (Nubia).

Further conquests
The Libyans, and soon the Greeks of Cyrene and Barca, willingly acknowledged the authority of Cambyses, and as proof of their submission, sent offerings to Cambyses. As a demonstration of his generosity, Cambyses had Amasis II's Greek widow, Ladice, returned to Cyrene. Cambyses originally intended to make an expedition against the Phoenician state of Carthage, but it was ultimately called off due to his Phoenician subjects' reluctance to  make war against their own people. In the south, Cambyses, followed the same policy of the last pharaohs to keep the Kingdom of Kush in check, and had a garrison established at Elephantine.

According to Herodotus, Cambyses' campaigns against Ammon in the Siwa Oasis and Ethiopia ended catastrophically. He states that the reason behind this defeat was the "madness" of Cambyses, who "at once began his march against Ethiopia, without any orders for the provision of supplies, and without for a moment considering the fact that he was to take his men to the ends of the earth". However, according to Briant, "the deliberate bias against Cambyses raises doubts about the accuracy of Herodotus's version." Herodotus' statement is contradicted by other sources that do not suggest a catastrophe for his forces, even though the obstacles of the campaign possibly compelled Cambyses to withdraw. Archaeological proof indicates that the Achaemenids made use of the stronghold of Dorginarti (south of Buhen) during the time they controlled Egypt.

Policies in Egypt

In accordance with the traditional Egyptian royal custom, Cambyses took the titles of "king of Upper and Lower Egypt" and "descendant of (the gods) Ra, Horus, Osiris," used by the previous Egyptian pharaohs. Cambyses used propaganda to show his Egyptian conquest as a legitimate unification with the native Egyptians, and that he was himself of Egyptian descent, claiming to be the son of Princess Nitetis, a daughter of the pharaoh Apries. At Sais, Cambyses had himself crowned in the temple of the goddess Neith as part of a religious ritual, during which he made sacrifices to the Egyptian gods.

According to ancient historians, Cambyses' rule of Egypt was marked by brutality, looting temples, ridiculing the local gods, and defilement of the royal tombs. Historians such as Herodotus put an emphasis on Cambyses' supposed killing of the Egyptian sacred bull Apis. However, no looting of temples has been reported by contemporary Egyptian sources. In addition, Cambyses is said to have ordered the burial of an Apis in a sarcophagus. The successor of the Apis died in 518 BC, four years after Cambyses had already died.

The epitaph of the Apis buried in 524 BC, states:

A legend on the sarcophagus also says:

This thus debunks Cambyses' supposed killing of the Apis, and according to Briant, proves that Herodotus documented bogus reports. Rather, Cambyses took part in the preservation and burial ceremony of an Apis. Other similar sources also make mention of Cambyses' careful treatment towards Egyptian culture and religion. According to the Egyptian Demotic Chronicle, Cambyses decreased the immense income that the Egyptian temples received from the Egyptian pharaohs. Only the three main temples were given permission to maintain all their entitlements. In response to this action, Egyptian priests who had lost their entitlements circulated spurious stories about Cambyses. The issue with the temples dated back to the earlier pharaohs, who had also tried to reduce the economic power of the temples. This issue would continue until the demise of ancient Egypt. Like Cyrus in Babylon, Cambyses allowed the Egyptian nobility to maintain their jurisdictions.

Administration 

Although a tax system existed during the reigns of Cyrus and Cambyses, it was not a systematic one, and thus the subjects of the king were either obligated to give gifts, or pay taxes. As was the case during his father's reign, Cambyses' satraps were all of Persian stock: Gubaru in Babylonia-Trans-Euphrates: Aryandes in Egypt: Oroetes in Sardis, Mitrobates in Dascylium, Dadarsi in Bactria, and Vivana in Arachosia. Likewise, the imperial treasurer in Babylon, Mithradata, was also from a Persian family. Indeed, the senior officials and officers accompanying Cambyses in Egypt were composed solely of Persians. The most notable of these Persians were relatives of the king, such as his cousin Darius, who occupied high offices under Cyrus and Cambyses, and serving as a spear-bearer under the latter. Darius' father, Hystaspes, served as the governor of Parthia and Hyrcania, or at least held a prominent role there. Important offices centred around the king was also occupied by the Persians, as in the case of Prexaspes, who served as the "message-bearer" of Cambyses, and Sisamnes, who was the royal judge but later executed by Cambyses.

Personality 
According to Herodotus, Cambyses was labelled a "despot" by the Persians due to his being "half-mad, cruel, and insolent". However, this would seem to be part of later Persian and Egyptian propaganda critical of Cambyses. Indeed, due to Cambyses' willingness to consolidate authority to himself, the Persian tribal nobility were increasingly antagonistic towards him.

Marriages
In Achaemenid Persia, marriages between family members, such as half-siblings, nieces and cousins took place but were not seen as incestuous. However, Greek sources state that brother-sister and father-daughter marriages allegedly took place inside the royal family, yet it remains problematic to determine the reliability of these accounts. According to Herodotus, Cambyses supposedly married two of his sisters, Atossa and Roxane. This would have been regarded as illegal. However, Herodotus also states that Cambyses married Otanes' daughter Phaidyme, whilst his contemporary Ctesias names Roxane as Cambyses' wife, but she is not referred to as his sister. 

The accusations against Cambyses of committing incest are mentioned as part of his "blasphemous actions", which were designed to illustrate his "madness and vanity". These reports all derive from the same Egyptian source that was antagonistic towards Cambyses, and some of these allegations of "crimes", such as the killing of the Apis bull, have been confirmed as false, which means that the report of Cambyses' supposed incestuous acts is questionable.

Death and succession
In the spring of 522 BC, Cambyses hurriedly left Egypt to deal with a rebellion in Persia. Before he left the country, he made Egypt into a satrapy under the governorship of the Persian Aryandes.

However Cambyses died shortly after under disputed circumstances.  By most accounts, while Cambyses was on his way through  Syria (Eber-Nari), he received a wound to the thigh, which soon became gangrenous. Cambyses died three weeks later (in July) at a location called Agbatana, which is most likely the modern city of Hama. He died childless, and was succeeded by his younger brother Bardiya.  

According to Darius, who was Cambyses' lance-bearer at the time, Bardiya decided that he could not succeed as King of Kings and died by his own hand in 522 BC. Herodotus and Ctesias ascribe his death to an accident. Ctesias writes that Cambyses, despondent from the loss of family members, stabbed himself in the thigh while working with a piece of wood, and died eleven days later from the wound. Herodotus' story is that while mounting his horse, the tip of Cambyses' scabbard broke and his sword pierced his thigh. Some modern historians suspect that Cambyses was assassinated, either by Darius as the first step to usurping the empire for himself, or by supporters of Bardiya.

Cambyses was buried in Neyriz in southeastern Persis. As reported in the Persepolis Administrative Archives, sacrifices were offered in his name. At the time of Cambyses' death, the Achaemenid Empire was stronger than ever, reaching from Cyrenaica to the Hindu Kush, and from the Syr Darya to the Persian Gulf.

See also
 Cambysene
 Cambyses Romance

Notes

References

Sources 
 
 
 
 
 
 
 
 

|-

 
522 BC deaths
6th-century BC Kings of the Achaemenid Empire
6th-century BC Pharaohs
6th-century BC Babylonian kings
Kings of the Achaemenid Empire
Pharaohs of the Achaemenid dynasty of Egypt
Twenty-seventh Dynasty of Egypt
Deaths from gangrene
Year of birth unknown
Kings of the Lands
Teispids
Fratricides